FAM107B is a gene found in humans. It is located on the minus strand of chromosome 10, p13, which is on the short arm of the chromosome. It has other alias names, such as C10orf45, FLJ45505, MGC11034 and MGC90261.  The gene contains a conserved domain, DUF1151, which is a family that consists of several eukaryotic proteins of unknown function. FAM107B is expressed in most tissues in the human body without there being a high frequency in any one tissue. It is found in all stages of human development.

Gene
The mRNA for FAM107B is 3785 base pairs long and contains five exons. The protein for FAM107B is known as LOC83641. It is 306 amino acids long. According to AceView, there are 27 spliced variants with 2 unspliced variants and 27 mRNAs of FAM107B. Of these variants and mRNAs, only 23 spliced and unspliced mRNAs are known to encode proteins of quality. Additionally, there appear to be 17 different isoforms. FAM107B is not a signal peptide, but is thought to be a protein that is exported to the mitochondria. It has the following genes located in its gene neighborhood: FRMD4A (FERM domain containing 4A); LOC100289125 (hypothetical protein LOC100289125); RPSAP7 (ribosomal protein SA pseudogene 7 in Homo sapiens); CDNF (cerebral dopamine neurotrophic factor; HSPA14.

FAM107B has one paralog, FAM107A, and many orthologs in organisms including primates, dogs, cows, mice, and chickens. With these orthologs, there is a high degree of conservation.

Structure
Two structures have a high similarity to that of FAM107B: that of a human septin trimer in Homo sapiens and that of the 3rd HMG-box of mouse UBF1. The septin trimer is that of a Ras-like GTPase superfamily whose members are known to regulate cytoskeletal reorganization, gene expression, vesicle trafficking, nucleocytoplasmic transport, and microtubule organization. The 3rd HMG-box of Mouse Ubf is part of the HMG-box superfamily whose members bind to DNA to bend or distort it where it can cause looping of linear DNA, create four-way DNA junctions, and DNA bulges. Members of this family also include mitochondrial transcription factors that bind at four-way DNA junctions.

Interacting proteins
Proteins exist that interact with the FAM107B protein:
autophagy proteins that are involved in the transport from the cytoplasm to the vacuole, and specifically Cvt vesicle formation;
the probable protein kinase, which is a heat shock-like protein as well as an antigen;
the kinesin-related protein which is a biliary glycoprotein isoantigen;
the hypothetical protein HP0231, which is a somatostatin receptor, as well as the ISWI complex protein 2, which is a mitochondrial reverse transcriptose-like protein;
the CG7077-PA open reading frame protein, which is known for the Alu repetitive sequence.

Model organisms
				
Model organisms have been used in the study of FAM107B function. A conditional knockout mouse line, called Fam107btm1a(KOMP)Wtsi was generated as part of the International Knockout Mouse Consortium program — a high-throughput mutagenesis project to generate and distribute animal models of disease to interested scientists.

Male and female animals underwent a standardized phenotypic screen to determine the effects of deletion. Twenty six tests were carried out on mutant mice and two significant abnormalities were observed: homozygous animals had abnormal brainstem auditory evoked potential and increased trabecular bone thickness.

References

Further reading
 AceView. NCBI. 
 Pfam. Wellcome Trust Sanger Institute. 
 De Vree, Paula. Application of molecular cytogenetic techniques to clarify apparently balanced complex chromosomal rearrangements in to patients with an abnormal phenotype: case report. Molecular Cytogenetics 2009, 2:15. BioMed Central Ltd. 
 The GeneCards Human Gene Database: Copyright © 1996-2009, Weizmann Institute of Science. All Rights Reserved. 
 Related Structures at NCBI. 
 Sigma Aldrich. FAM107B. 
 Database of Interacting Proteins. 
 Sigma Aldrich. 
 Conserved Domains at NCBI. 
 Marchler-Bauer A et al. (2009), "CDD: specific functional annotation with the Conserved Domain Database.", Nucleic Acids Res.37(D)205-10. Conserved Domains at NCBI. 

Genes on human chromosome 10
Genes mutated in mice